Mathews may refer to:

Places in the United States
Mathews, Alabama
Mathews, Louisiana
Mathews, Virginia
Mathews County, Virginia
Mathews Bridge over the St. Johns River, Jacksonville, Florida

People
 Matthew the Apostle
 Sir David Mathew or Sir David ap Mathew, Welsh knight
 Mathews (given name)
 Mathews I or Baselios Marthoma Mathews I (1907–1996), former primate of Malankara Church, also known as Indian Orthodox Church
 Mathews II or Baselios Marthoma Mathews II (1915–2006), former primate of the Malankara Church, also known as Indian Orthodox Church
  Mathews III or Baselios Marthoma Mathews III, the current primate of the Malankara Church, also known as Indian Orthodox Church
 Mathews (surname)
 Mathews family, a US political family

See also
Mathew
Matthews (disambiguation)